Karli is an English feminine given name that is an alternate form of Karlie and Carly as well as Danish and Swedish feminine given name that is a diminutive form of Karla and an alternate form of Karly. It is a Danish, Finnish, Icelandic , Old Danish, Old Norse  and Swedish masculine given name that is a diminutive form of Karl. Notable people known by this name include the following:

Given name
Karli June Cerankowski, female American professor
Karli Coburger (born 1929), male German military officer
Karli Johansen (born 1992), female Canadian field hockey player
Karli Sohn-Rethel (1882–1966), male German painter
Karli Whetstone, female American country music writer and singer

Surname
Max Karli, Swiss film producer
Musa Karli (born 1990), German football player

Fictional characters
Karli, female muppet character on Sesame Street
Karli, twin sister of Kami in The Amazing Race
Karli, character in the Vinland Saga manga
Karli Morgenthau (Flag Smasher), fictional supervillainess in Marvel Comics franchise

See also

Kali (name)
Kalli (name)
Karai (disambiguation)
Karbi (disambiguation)
Kari (name)
Karki (surname)
Karl (given name)
Karla (name)
Karle (name)
Karlie
Karlik (name)
Karlin (surname)
Kārlis
Karlo (name)
Karly
Karoli (name)
Karri (name)

Notes

Danish feminine given names
English feminine given names
Swedish feminine given names
Danish masculine given names
Finnish masculine given names
Icelandic masculine given names
Swedish masculine given names